The Sony Cyber-shot DSC-HX200V is a hyperzoom bridge digital camera that features:
 18.2 megapixel resolution
 Fast f/2.8 Carl Zeiss-branded zoom lens with super 30x zoom range
 Mega O.I.S. (optical image stabilizer) in the lens, reducing blurring by compensating for hand shake
 Intelligent ISO Control
 2x Digital Zoom
 Multiple modes of operation, including manual modes
 Full HD 1080p movie mode in both normal and wide aspect ratio
 Compact size and moderate weight
 As with most Sony Cyber-shot cameras it uses a BIONZ engine, in this case the BIONZ a99.

The camera has a 3" color LCD display and a color electronic viewfinder, and is available in two colors, black (suffix K) and silver (suffix S).
The Cyber-shot DSC-HX200V release to the USA was announced on February 28, 2012. The successor to the HX200V is the HX300.

Reviews 
http://www.dcresource.com/reviews/sony/dsc_hx200v-review/page-0,1
http://www.cameralabs.com/reviews/Sony_Cyber-shot_DSC_HX200V/
http://www.lesnumeriques.com/appareil-photo-numerique/sony-cyber-shot-hx200v-p12817/test.html
http://www.dpreview.com/reviews/sony-cyber-shot-dsc-hx200v
http://www.trustedreviews.com/sony-cyber-shot-hx200v_Digital-Camera_review
http://www.imaging-resource.com/PRODS/sony-hx200v/sony-hx200vA.HTM
http://www.photographyblog.com/reviews/sony_cybershot_dsc_hx200v_review/
http://www.digitalcamerareview.com/default.asp?newsID=4981&review=sony+cybershot+hx200
http://www.techradar.com/reviews/cameras-and-camcorders/cameras/compact-cameras/sony-hx200v-1077673/review

References

HX200V
Superzoom cameras